Algorta is a village in the Río Negro Department of Uruguay.

Geography
It is situated on the Cuchilla de Haedo range of hills.

History
On 24 July 1929, its status was elevated to "Pueblo" (village) by decree Ley Nº 8.448.

Population
In 2011 Algorta had a population of 779.
 
Source: Instituto Nacional de Estadística de Uruguay

References

External links
INE map of Algorta

Populated places in the Río Negro Department